Mongolian Death Worm is a 2010 television film directed by Steven R. Monroe and stars Sean Patrick Flanery that was aired on May 8, 2010 on Syfy.

Plot 

An American corporation sets up operations in Mongolia to search for shale oil by pumping superheated water into the earth. The project encounters mysterious mechanical failures and delays. At the same time, the on-site manager, Patrick, is worried that the equipment failures and delays will attract too much attention from corporate bosses. The drilling operations have disturbed a nest of Mongolian death worms known in the legends of the indigenous people. They are monstrously long and lethal creatures that tunnel underground, similar to the Graboid creatures seen in Tremors, though slimier looking, with an enormous maw of teeth, poisonous venom, and the ability to generate an electromagnetic field that interferes with communications and other equipment. One of the oil field workers is attacked and killed. Frightened by the rumors, other workers avoid showing up for work. With the drilling operation (and his side deal) threatened, Patrick starts to panic when Mr. Bixler, a corporate boss, shows up to find out what's going on.

At the same time, a group of volunteer medical workers, Doctors of Hope, is trying to stop a disease outbreak in a Mongolian village caused by the worms contaminating the water sources. The lead doctor, Alicia, encounters Daniel when she and a colleague, Phillip, need transportation for themselves and their medical supplies to the village where the rest of her team is working. Daniel is a target of the chief crime boss in the area, Kowlan, because of Daniel's treasure-hunting forays into their territory. We eventually learn that Daniel already knows about the legend of the worms and has found artifacts with engraved images of the creatures. He believes his finds will lead him to a treasure—Genghis Khan's tomb.

While transporting the two doctors to the village of Sepegal, Daniel's truck breaks down, and they are taken captive by Kowlan's men. A friend of Daniel's, local police officer Timur, finds Daniel's abandoned vehicle by the road and starts searching for him. Back at Kowlan's camp, Daniel creates a distraction so that the two doctors can escape. During a gun battle, worms emerge from the ground and eat Kowlan and his men. Daniel fires into a fuel tank and blows up one of the worms. Alicia and Phillip return to get the medical supplies from Daniel's truck and continue to Sepegal, where the epidemic is raging. Another doctor, Steffi, tells Alicia that sick, elderly people have been insisting that the "death worms" cause the epidemic. Alicia and Phillip have not seen any worms, but they heard Kowlan and Daniel talking about them.

Patrick, desperate to still make his black market deal, reveals his duplicity when he pulls a gun on Bixler, who is on the phone with the corporation. Patrick ties him up in the office. Soon, another corporate manager shows up and, while looking through the plant for Bixler, is promptly eaten. Still unaware of the worm threat, Patrick takes Bixler down to the lower level, where he binds him to a support column and gags him. Daniel reaches his truck and then goes to Sepegal to warn Alicia about the worms; he insists they need to move the temporary clinic and its patients somewhere else. One of the local people, a nurse, says they could find a phone and help at the oil drilling facility not far away. When they arrive at the plant, Daniel and Alicia are confronted by one of Patrick's people, Bana, who only participated in the theft scheme to help his people; he lets Daniel and Alicia inside when a worm appears behind them ready to kill. Alicia theorizes that the worms are a type of organism released from stasis because of hot water pumping deep into the earth. If the pumping stops, no new worms should be "hatched." In Sepegal, Phillip and the nurse, Thuan, are drawing water from the well when Thuan is sucked in by a worm and killed. Phillip and Steffi run back to the clinic as the worms begin to surround it.

Daniel and Bana shut down the pumps, then Bana panics and runs away, leaving Daniel behind. As Bana emerges from the plant, Patrick and the other accomplice return from taking a crate of stolen loot to another hiding place. Bana yells at them to leave, but Patrick shoots him in the back as he runs to the truck. He then discovers Alicia in the plant office; she is on the phone with Officer Timur, explaining that Sepegal needs help. Timur rushes to Sepegal and kills several worms. He tells the staff that more help is on the way, then he waits in the clinic with the staff and patients.

Daniel goes down to the lower levels of the plant, where he finds what he has been seeking, Genghis Khan's treasure. Patrick shows up, gun drawn, while his associate has Alicia at knifepoint. Daniel has to put his gun down. He distracts Patrick by pointing out Bixler's remains, and they get into a wrestling match. Daniel shoots Patrick in the shoulder. The ground shakes, and worms begin to emerge from the walls. Patrick's henchman is eaten, and Daniel realizes that this is the queen worm's nest. Timur arrives at the plant to find Daniel and Alicia and discovers Bana's body outside. Daniel discovers the room full of crates holding the treasure from the tomb. He breaks open a box, and artifacts and gold pour onto the floor. Alicia reminds him that it isn't worth dying for, and he agrees that they must obliterate the plant. Patrick limps into view, bleeding badly. Timur appears with a shotgun in hand. Behind him, the queen creeps up and eats Patrick. Daniel and Alicia attempt to build up the pressure in the generators and pipes. More worms show up just as they are about to escape from the building. Timur shoots them, but the queen eats him. Daniel and Alicia rush outside as the explosions go off. Daniel returns Alicia to Sepegal and her colleagues. He says he is going back to collect the treasure from the field around the plant and drives away.

Cast

Home media 
Mongolian Death Worm was released on DVD on April 26, 2011 by Lions Gate Entertainment.

Reception 
Critical reception has been mixed, with several outlets alternating between praising and criticizing the movie for its cheesiness. DVD Verdict panned the movie, writing "Forgetting the really poor CGI, the problem is just how dumb you need to be for these giant worms to be a serious threat. Though the worms run up a decent body count, this is solely down to their victims' stupidity. One after another, people just stand dumbstruck, waiting for the amazingly slow-moving worms to devour them. You wouldn't even need to break a sweat to outpace these invertebrates." Dread Central also heavily criticized Mongolian Death Worms, calling it an "instantly forgettable Syfy monster-of-the-week formula feature" and also stating that "I'm sure for some it will pass the time on a rainy day. Hopefully you live in an arid climate."

In contrast, HorrorNews.net and BeyondHollywood.com both wrote overall favorable reviews for the movie, as both praised Flanery's performance and BeyondHollywood.com commented that "Bad movies fanatics will have no problem consuming the massive amount of cheese caked all over Steven R. Monroe's brisk little monster movie. And while Worm certainly doesn't redefine the genre, it should give SyFy original movie aficionados exactly what they're craving. At the end of the day, that's pretty much all you can ask for when you sit down with a movie that bears the title Mongolian Death Worm."

References

External links 
 
 
 

2010 television films
2010 horror films
2010 action films
2010s science fiction films
Action television films
American action films
American monster movies
American science fiction television films
CineTel Films films
Films directed by Steven R. Monroe
Films scored by Pinar Toprak
2010s monster movies
Sonar Entertainment films
Syfy original films
2010 films
2010s American films
Films about worms